Anna Vyacheslavovna Shumilova-Dyachenko (born August 25, 1980) is an honored Master of Sports coach in Rhythmic gymnastics.

Personal life 
She is married to 2012 Olympic champion in Canoe sprint, Alexander Dyachenko. Their daughter, Inna was born in 2014

Coaching career 
A merited master of Sports in rhythmic gymnastics, Shumilova has been a coach of Club Dynamo - Dmitrov since 2003 and is a member of the Russian Rhythmic Gymnastics National Trainers.

Shumilova has produced Olympic and multiple World Champions notably Daria Kondakova and Alina Makarenko.
She is coaching Aleksandra Soldatova, Daria Dubova, Anastasiia Tatareva, Maria Tolkacheva, and Veronika Polyakova.

Notable trainees 
 Daria Kondakova - three time all-around World silver medalist and four time World champion.
 Alina Makarenko - 2012 Olympics Group gold medalist.
 Aleksandra Soldatova - 2018 World ribbon champion, 2015 World silver medalist and 2016 Grand Prix Final champion.
 Anastasiia Tatareva - 2016 Olympics Group gold medalist, 2015 World Group All-around champion and (2014, 2015) European Group All-around champion.
 Maria Tolkacheva - 2016 Olympics Group gold medalist, 2015 World Group All-around champion and (2014, 2015) European Group All-around champion.
 Daria Dubova - 2014 Youth Olympic Group all-around gold medalist.
 Daria Svatkovskaya - 2013 European Hoop and team champion and 2012 Russian National all-around silver medalist
 Veronika Polyakova - European junior team gold medalist.

References

External links
 Anna Shumilova Dynamo-Dmitrov
 Rhythmic Gymnastics Results
 

1980 births
Living people
Russian gymnastics coaches
Honoured Coaches of Russia